Walking Papers is the debut album by the American rock band Walking Papers, released on August 6, 2013. USA Today called the album "powerful yet nuanced, a kind of rock confident enough in itself that it rarely needs force to make its point." Consequence of Sound was less charitable, saying "It’s a record that largely eschews typical hard rock fare, opting instead for a blues rock that slinks and wafts as much as it crunches and blusters."

Track listing
All songs written by Jeff Angell and Barrett Martin, except as noted.

Personnel
Walking Papers
Jeff Angell – lead vocals, guitar, piano
Duff McKagan – bass, backing vocals
Benjamin Anderson – keyboards, backing vocals
Barrett Martin – drums, percussion, upright bass, keyboards, backing vocals

Additional musicians
Mike McCready – Guitar solo on tracks 2 and 8
Dave Carter – Trumpet on tracks 4 and 10
Dan Spalding – Baritone sax on tracks 4 and 8 
Ed Ulman – Trombone on track 4

References

2013 albums
Walking Papers (band) albums